Andhra Vishnu, better known as Srikakula Mahavishnu statue, was set up in Andhra in a pre-existing older temple. The previous deistic form worshiped in the temple is unknown.

Āndhra Vishnu temple
The deity of the temple is known as Andhra Maha Vishnu or Srikakulandhra Maha Vishnu. The main sanctum of the temple survived at least since the time of the Satavahana emperors. The deity for whom the Satavahanas built the temple is unknown. The temple was also repaired and worshipped restored by the Rajas of Challapalli after a period of decline due to Muslim raids.

This temple has many attractions and historical links. As many as 32 inscriptions, including those issued by Krishnadevaraya, appear on the walls of the temple. The presiding deity has some striking peculiarities. The deity holds a sankha in right hand and a chakra in left hand as against usual practice of vice versa.The inscriptions on Avatars were added after 1010 reconstruction. The oldest version had no reference to any other forms
Likewise, Krishna does not find place in dasavatara (the ten incarnations of Vishnu) here. The list includes, Matsya, Koorma, Varaha, Narasimha, Vamana, Parasurama, Rama, Balarama, Buddha and Kalki. The present temple is said to be existing from 1010 A.D., and was reconstructed twice before now.

Andhra Kaumudi
In Andhra Kaumudi, a Telugu grammar book it was mentioned that he was son of Suchandra. It seems Āndhra Viṣhṇu having built an immense wall, connecting Sri Sailam, Bheemeswaram, and Kaleswaram, with the Mahendra hills, formed in it three gates, in which the three eyed Ishwara, bearing the trident in his hand and attended by a host of divine gods resided in the form of three lingams. Āndhra Viṣhṇu assisted by divine gods having fought with the great giant Nishambhu for thirteen yugas killed him in battle and took up his residence with the sages on the banks of the river Godavari, since which time, the Andhra country has been named Trilingam.

Andhra Nayaka Satakam
Andhra Nayaka Satakam was written by Kasula Purushottama Kavi, a poet who enjoyed the patronage of the Zamindar of Challapalli in Diviseema region of Andhra Pradesh. After hearing this satakam and being moved by it, the Srikakulandhra Maha Vishnu Temple was also repaired and worshipped restored by the Zamindars of Challapalli.

This satakam is notable because of the vyāja ninda and vyāja stuti employed to denounce Andhra Viṣhṇu and put him down for his various qualities and actions while actually praising him indirectly.

Āmuktamālyada

Once the Vijayanagara emperor Krishnadevaraya was travelling via Vijayawada during his Kalinga campaign. He had conquered Vijayawada, Kondapalli fort and the surrounding areas. He learned of the holy temple of Andhra Viṣhṇu and visited Srikakulam village for a few days. He performed the Ekadasi Vratam during that time. It is here that Andhra Viṣhṇu appeared to the emperor in an early morning dream.

Krishnadevaraya said 

Andhra Viṣhṇu told him to compose the story of his wedding with Andal at Srirangam. He also ordered the emperor to tell the story in the Telugu language. The emperor obliged, composing Amuktamalyada which is one of the most famous poetic works in Telugu literature. From 14th poem of this work we can see that the Lord Śrī Āndhra Viṣhṇu refers himself as King of Telugus (Telugu Vallabhunḍa) and refers Sri Krishnadevaraya as Kannada King (Kannaḍa Rāya).

Meaning of Quote :"The nation that knows Telugu will have clarity.  Vallaba (Chief herdsman, lord) is Telugu and Telugu will be a protection. A language used in courts of all kings. In the languages of the all nations  Telugu is used in abundance and is excellent.
Within Amuktamalyada itself it was mentioned that on a Harivasara, Sri Krishnadevaraya had the Darsan of Andhra Viṣhṇu. Harivasara is the time between the last four muhurtas of Ekadasi and the first four muhurtas of Dwadasi, i.e., 6 hours and 24 minutes. This incident of visiting the temple must be between Ahobilam Śaasanam (dated December 1515) and Simhāchalam Śaasanam (dated 30 March 1515)

Popular culture
In 1962, the Telugu movie named Srikakula Andhra Maha Vishnu Katha was made based on the story of this legendary king, directed by A. K. Sekhar, casting N. T. Rama Rao, Jamuna, S. V. Ranga Rao, M. Balaiah, Relangi, Girija, L. Vijaya Lakshmi, Chaya Devi, Mudigonda Linga Murthy. Producer was D. Lakshminarayana Chowdary and music was given by Pendyala Nageswara Rao.

gallery

References
Srinivas, Sistla., (Tr.) Sri Krishna Deva Raya's Amuktamalyada, Visakhapatnam, 2010.

Telugu people
History of Andhra Pradesh
Indian Hindus
Hindu monarchs